Turkey (listed as TUR) participated in the 6th AIBA Women’s World Boxing Championship held between September 9–18, 2010 at Garfield Sobers Gymnasium in Bridgetown, Barbados.

With ten women boxers participating, Turkey garnered one gold medal only.

Participants

Medals

Results by event

Legend
DSQ Disqualified
 R Round
RSC Referee Stop Contest
WO Walkover

References 

Women's World Boxing Championships
2010 World Women's Boxing Championship
2010 in Turkish women's sport